Donald P. Borchers is a film producer, director, and screenwriter.

Biography
Donald P. Borchers is an American producer. Borchers was a production associate at Avco Embassy Pictures in the early 1980s.

An independent production deal with New World Pictures resulted in Children of the Corn (1984) and other films. Borchers founded Planet Productions Corp., and went on to produce Two Moon Junction (1988), Leprechaun 2 (1994), and others. He produced three films for Steven Spielberg's Amblin Playhouse television series and served as an adjunct professor at the University of Southern California School of Cinema/Television.

Archives
The moving image collection of Donald P. Borchers is held at the Academy Film Archive. The film collection at the Academy Film Archive is complemented by the Donald P. Borchers papers held at the Academy's Margaret Herrick Library.

Filmography

Film director

Screenwriter

Film producer

Television producer

Other projects
From 1984 to 1996, Borchers served as an adjunct professor at the Peter Stark Producing Program, a Master of Fine Arts program in the USC School of Cinematic Arts teaching CIN 565, the budgeting and scheduling requisite class.  In 2016, Borchers started a YouTube channel.

References

External links

Donald P. Borchers, on My-Blog-of-Interviews
Episode 28 – Donald P. Borchers, The Zicree Simkins Podcast

American film producers
American film directors
American male screenwriters
American television directors
American television writers
American television producers
American male television writers
Living people
Year of birth missing (living people)
Place of birth missing (living people)
20th-century American screenwriters
20th-century American male writers
21st-century American screenwriters
21st-century American male writers
USC School of Cinematic Arts faculty